"Si Estuviésemos Juntos" (stylized in upper case; English: "If We Were Together") is a song by Puerto Rican rapper Bad Bunny. The song was released through Rimas Entertainment on February 14, 2019. The nostalgic reggaeton song reminisces about a former lover.

Music video
The video was released on February 14, 2019 and it currently has more than 350 million views. The nostalgic song tells the story of the Puerto Rican reggaeton singer reminiscing about a former lover, with the video.

Charts

Weekly charts

Year-end charts

References

2018 singles
2018 songs
Bad Bunny songs
Spanish-language songs
Songs written by Bad Bunny
Songs written by Camilo (singer)